Hadia Mohamed Hosny Elsaid Mohamed Tawfik El Said (born 30 July 1988) is an Egyptian badminton player playing in the Beijing 2008 and London 2012 Olympics. She won the women's singles title at the 2010 African Championships, and emerged as the women's doubles gold medalist at the 2019 African Games.

Personal life 
She is currently working as a teaching assistant at the faculty of pharmacy of the British University in Egypt. She received a Bachelor's degree in Pharmacy from Ain Shams University in 2010 and an MSc degree in Medical biosciences from the University of Bath in 2012. Since 2015, she is attending as PhD student at the Pharmacology department of the Cairo University.

Career 
She started playing badminton in 2000. Her squash coach Tamer Raafet at school was in Egypt national badminton team, and she had just quit gymnastics for an injury the year before and it was hard to get back, then she decide to try badminton.

In September 2013, it was reported that she was one of the 14 players selected for the Road to Rio Program, a program that aimed to help African badminton players to compete at the 2016 Olympic Games.

Hadia Started her own Hadia Hosny Badminton Academy (HHBA) in Heliopolis Sporting club and Black ball to train the future generation of athletes in badminton and help the spreading of the sport more.

Achievements

African Games 
Women's singles

Women's doubles

Mixed doubles

African Championships 
Women's singles

Women's doubles

Mixed doubles

Pan Arab Games 

Women's singles

BWF International Challenge/Series (20 titles, 22 runners-up) 
Women's singles

Women's doubles

Mixed doubles

  BWF International Challenge tournament
  BWF International Series tournament
  BWF Future Series tournament

References

External links 
 
 

1988 births
Living people
Sportspeople from Cairo
Alumni of the University of Bath
Egyptian female badminton players
Badminton players at the 2008 Summer Olympics
Badminton players at the 2012 Summer Olympics
Olympic badminton players of Egypt
Competitors at the 2007 All-Africa Games
Competitors at the 2011 All-Africa Games
Competitors at the 2015 African Games
Competitors at the 2019 African Games
African Games gold medalists for Egypt
African Games bronze medalists for Egypt
African Games medalists in badminton
Competitors at the 2013 Mediterranean Games
Competitors at the 2018 Mediterranean Games
Mediterranean Games competitors for Egypt
Badminton players at the 2020 Summer Olympics